Michał Bryl (born 9 October 1994) is a Polish beach volleyball player. He competed in the 2020 Summer Olympics.

References

External links
 
 
 
 
 

1994 births
Living people
Sportspeople from Łódź
People from Łask
Beach volleyball players at the 2020 Summer Olympics
Polish beach volleyball players
Olympic beach volleyball players of Poland